The governor of Saint Helena is the representative of the British monarch in the United Kingdom's overseas territory of Saint Helena, Ascension and Tristan da Cunha. The governor is appointed by the monarch on the official advice of His Majesty's Government (HMG).

The role of the governor is to act as the de facto head of state as well as the de jure head of government and commander-in-chief of the territory, which consists of the islands of Saint Helena and Ascension and the group of islands of Tristan da Cunha. The governor's responsibilities include internal security, external affairs, the administration of justice, finance, shipping and employment, as well as disciplinary action in respect of any public officer. The governor is based on Saint Helena and is represented by resident administrators, appointed by HMG, on both Ascension Island and Tristan da Cunha. The governor also appoints three members to Saint Helena's Executive Council (the balance being popularly elected); the officeholder, with some exceptions, is bound to seek and act in accordance with their advice.

The governor's flag in Saint Helena is the Union Flag defaced with the territory's coat of arms. The official residence, Plantation House, is located near the capital Jamestown. The Governor's Office is located within The Castle, along with the office of the chief secretary of Saint Helena, who runs the day-to-day administrative part of the government.

Before 2009 the territory was known as Saint Helena, of which Ascension and Tristan da Cunha were dependencies. A new constitution that came into force in 2009 changed the name of the territory to Saint Helena, Ascension and Tristan da Cunha; however, the governor's title remained as the "Governor of Saint Helena". The governor of Saint Helena nonetheless is the British monarch's representative across the territory.

The current governor of Saint Helena has been Nigel Phillips since 13 August 2022.

Acting governor and the governor's deputy 
Under the St Helena, Ascension and Tristan da Cunha Constitution Order 2009, an acting governor is appointed when the office of governor is vacant or the governor is unable to fulfill his or her duties long term. The acting governor is appointed by the King.

If the governor is off the island for a short time (including visits to Ascension or Tristan da Cunha) or is ill for a short period), the governor may appoint anyone on St Helena to be deputy. The deputy must follow any instructions issued by the governor. It is current practice to appoint an acting governor when the governor is away from the island of Saint Helena, even if visiting either Ascension Island or Tristan da Cunha.

In recent years the chief secretary (or the attorney general) has taken on this temporary role in the governor's absence, the most recent times being in January 2011 when the governor travelled to Tristan da Cunha and the chief secretary became deputy governor and then later in 2011 when Kenneth Baddon, the attorney general, became deputy governor.

List of governors of Saint Helena

East India Company governors
The territory was governed by the East India Company from its initial colonization in 1659 to the end of company rule in 1834.

 Capt. John Dutton 1659–1660
 Capt. Robert Stringer 1660–1669
 Capt. Richard Coney 1669–1672
 Capt. Anthony Beal 1672–73
 Dutch East India Company interregnum – January to May 1673
 Capt. Richard Keigwin 1673–1674 (interim)
 Capt. Gregory Field 1674–1678
 Maj. John Blackmore 1678–1690
 Capt. Joshua Johnson 1690–1693 – assassinated, whilst Governor, on the island
 Capt. Richard Keling 1693–1697
 Capt. Stephen Poirier 1697–1707
 Capt. John Roberts 1708–1711
 Capt. Benjamin Boucher 1711–1713
 Capt. Isaac Pike 1713–1718
 Edward Johnson 1718–1722
 Capt. John Smith 1722–1726
 Edward Byfiel 1727–1731
 Capt. Charles Hutchinson 1746–1764

 Sir Robert Brooke 1788–1800
 Francis Robson 13 Jul 1801 – 11 Mar 1802, Acting Governor and East India Company officer
 Colonel Robert Patton Mar 1802 – July 1807
 Mark Wilks 1813–1816
 Major-General Sir Hudson Lowe 1816–1821
 John Pine Coffin 1821–1823
  Brigadier General Alexander Walker 1823–1828
 Charles Dallas 1828–1834

British Crown governors
Following on from St Helena becoming a crown colony in 1834, the first governor was appointed in 1836.

 1836 – Major General George Middlemore
 1842 – Colonel Hamelin Trelawny
 1846 – Major General Sir Patrick Ross
 1851 – Colonel Sir Thomas Gore Browne
 1856 – Sir Edward Drummond-Hay
 1863 – Admiral Sir Charles Elliot
 1870 – Vice Admiral Charles George Edward Patey
 1873 – Hudson Ralph Janisch
 1890 – Sir William Grey-Wilson
 1897 – Robert Armitage Sterndale
 1903 – Lieutenant-Colonel Sir Henry Galway
 1912 – Major Sir Harry Cordeaux
 1920 – Colonel Robert Peel
 1925 – Lieutenant-Colonel Harold Iremonger (Acting Governor)
 1925 – Sir Charles Harper
 1932 – Sir Spencer Davis
 1938 – Sir Guy Pilling
 1941 – Major William Bain Gray
 1947 – Sir George Joy
 1954 – Sir James Harford
 1958 – George Albert Lewis (Acting Governor)
 1960 – Sir Robert Alford
 1963 – Sir John Field
 1969 – Sir Dermod Murphy
 1971 – Sir Thomas Oates
 1976 – Geoffrey Colin Guy
 1981 – John Dudley Massingham
 1984 – Francis Eustace Baker
 1988 – Robert F Stimson
 1991 – Alan Hoole
 1995 – David Leslie Smallman
 1999 – David Hollamby
 2004 – Michael Clancy
 2004 – Martin Hallam (Acting Governor)
 2007 – Andrew Gurr
 2011 – Kevin Baddon (Acting Governor)
 2011 – Mark Andrew Capes
 2016 – Lisa Honan
 2019 – Louise MacMorran (Acting Governor)
 2019 – Dr Philip Rushbrook
 2022 – Greg Gibson (Acting Governor)
 2022 – Nigel Phillips

See also
Administrator of Ascension Island
Administrator of Tristan da Cunha

References

External links
 Saint Helena Government

A complete list of the Governors of St. Helena

British Empire
 
1659 establishments in the British Empire